Rohini is a 1953 Indian Tamil-language film directed by Kamal Ghosh and produced by S. Mukherjee. It is an adaptation of the Bengali novel Krishnakanter Uil by Bankim Chandra Chatterjee. The film was released on 5 November 1953 and failed commercially.

Plot 
A wealthy zamindar writes a will disposing of his property. He does not want to give the entire estate to his son who despises his father. The zamindar wants to give a major portion of the estate to one of his close relatives and he has a sister named Rohini, who is a widow. The zamindar son persuades Rohini to steal the will and substitute it with a counterfeit. She promptly does so, but after learning of the intentions of the zamindar son, she changes her decision and tries to replace the counterfeit with the original. She is then caught in the act, leading to a chain of events which includes kidnap and murder.

Cast 
Credits adapted from The Hindu:
 S. V. Ranga Rao
 Madhuri Devi
 S. A. Natarajan
 S. V. Sahasranamam
 Rajasulochana
G. Varalakshmi
 C. K. Saraswathi
 T. P. Muthulakshmi
 Lanka Satyam

Production 
Rohini was adapted from the Bengali novel Krishnakanter Uil (Krishnakant's Will) by Bankim Chandra Chatterjee. It was directed by Kamal Ghosh and produced by S. Mukherjee under Madras Art Productions. The screenplay was written by S. D. Sundaram. G. Ramanathan composed the music, with K. V. Mahadevan and D. C. Dutt, while A. Marudhakasi wrote the lyrics. The cinematography was handled by P. L. Rai and H. S. Venu under the supervision of Ghosh. Hiralal choreographed the dances.

Reception 
Rohini was released on 5 November 1953. According to film historian Randor Guy, the film was not a commercial success because of "alleged financial problems". However, he praised the storyline, the cinematography, the direction and the cast performances.

References

External links 
 

1950s Tamil-language films
Films based on Indian novels
Films scored by G. Ramanathan
Films scored by K. V. Mahadevan
Indian drama films